Le Courrier de l'Atlas is a French newspaper specialising in reporting about issues regarding the Maghreb in Europe. Fedwa Misk is one of its contributors.

References

External links 

Newspapers published in France